Crusader states were four realms—the Principality of Antioch, County of Edessa, Kingdom of Jerusalem and County of Tripoli—formed in the Levant as a result of the First Crusade between 1098 and 1109.

'''Crusader states may also include:
Kingdom of Cyprus, a state on the island of Cyprus from 1196 to 1489
Frankokratia, or Frankish Greece, the realms established on the ruins of the Byzantine Empire after the Fourth Crusade in the early 13th century
State of the Teutonic Order, a monastic state established by the Teutonic Knights in the Baltic region
Terra Mariana, a state established in Livonia in the aftermath of the Livonian Crusade on 2 February 1207